Evana Manandhar was born in Nepal and was awarded the title of Miss Nepal World 2014. She is a Nepalese businesswoman, model, and beauty pageant titleholder. She was crowned Miss Nepal 2015 

 and represented Nepal in Miss World 2015. Manandhar's predecessor to the crown was Subin Limbu.

Education

Manandhar gave her S.L.C (secondary board) from Shuvatara School. She also holds a bachelor's degree in business administration from Wilkes University, USA.

Awards
Manandhar received the Dean's Excellence Award in Marketing and the International Student of the Year Award.

References

External links  
 Evana Manandhar on WikiNepal
 Evana Manandhar Website

Living people
1991 births
People from Kathmandu
Miss World 2015 delegates
Miss Nepal winners
Nepalese female models
Nepalese beauty pageant winners